Christopher Reuben Calladine FRS FREng (born 19 January 1935) is a British engineer,  emeritus professor at University of Cambridge, and fellow of Peterhouse, Cambridge.

Works

References

External links

Members of the University of Cambridge Department of Engineering
Fellows of the Royal Society
Fellows of Peterhouse, Cambridge
Living people
Fellows of the Royal Academy of Engineering
1935 births
British structural engineers
Engineering professors at the University of Cambridge